Cantrills Filmnotes was a magazine about experimental films published in Melbourne, Australia, between 1971 and 2000.

History and profile
Cantrills Filmnotes was founded and published by Arthur and Corinne Cantrill. The first issue of the magazine appeared in March 1971. The headquarters was in Melbourne. The frequency of the magazine varied: for the first two years it was published on a bi-monthly basis; from 1973 to 1974 it was published four times a year and from 1975 to 2000 it was published biannually.

Cantrills Filmnotes was financed by the Australian Film Commission from October 1984 (issue #45/46) to December 1998 (issue #91/92). The magazine covered articles, which featured the reviews of experimental films or avant-garde films, video art and digital media. Cantrills Filmnotes ceased publication with the issue December 1999-January 2000 (#93-100) due to financial problems.

See also
 List of film periodicals

References

1971 establishments in Australia
2000 disestablishments in Australia
Biannual magazines published in Australia
Bi-monthly magazines published in Australia
Defunct magazines published in Australia
Film magazines published in Australia
Magazines established in 1971
Magazines disestablished in 2000
Magazines published in Melbourne
Quarterly magazines published in Australia